Hell on Earth: A Tribute to the Misfits is a tribute album to the American horror punk band Misfits released in 2000 by Cleopatra Records. It features primarily industrial rock, death metal and garage punk bands performing cover versions of Misfits songs from the band's early era, 1977 to 1983. Except for Electric Hellfire Club's cover, all of these covers had been released on a previous Misfits tribute album titled Hell on Earth... Hail to Misfits in 1996.

Track listing

References 

2000 compilation albums
Cleopatra Records compilation albums
Misfits (band) tribute albums
Industrial rock compilation albums
Death metal compilation albums
Garage punk compilation albums
Horror punk compilation albums